Several ships of the Royal Navy have borne the name HMS Montagu or HMS Montague:
 , a 52-gun  frigate launched in 1654 as Lyme, renamed in 1660, rebuilt in 1698 and 1716 and broken up in 1749.
   was a 60-gun fourth rate ship of the line of the Royal Navy, launched at Sheerness Dockyard on 15 September 1757. In 1774 she was sunk to form part of a breakwater.
 , an  74-gun third rate launched in 1779 and broken up in 1818.
 , a  launched in 1901 and wrecked in 1906.

Royal Navy ship names